Chhouk Rin is a former Khmer Rouge commander. He was sentenced to life imprisonment for the murder of three tourists, Australian David Wilson, 29, Briton Mark Slater, 28, and Frenchman Jean-Michel Braquet, 27 at Phnom Voar in 1994. In 2005, he escaped to Phnom Penh where he evaded capture because he believed that Sam Bith and Nuon Paet are the guilty ones. After he was captured, he lost an appeal to overturn the ruling that sentenced him to life imprisonment in Prey Sar prison.

References

Cambodian military personnel
Cambodian prisoners sentenced to life imprisonment
Prisoners sentenced to life imprisonment by Cambodia
Cambodian people convicted of murder
People convicted of murder by Cambodia
Living people
Communist Party of Kampuchea politicians
Year of birth missing (living people)